Malmö South, Svågertorp Station, is a railway station south of Malmö, Sweden. It is served by the Pågatåg between Helsingborg and Trelleborg.
There is a big shopping centre at Svågertorp near the station. The largest shop is IKEA with 44,000 m2 area.

History
Opened in 2000 in connection with the new railway and Öresund Bridge between Denmark and Sweden this station used to be served by the Øresund trains. Since the opening of the city tunnel these trains don't pass this station. It used to be the only station en route between Malmö Central Station and Copenhagen Airport, Kastrup Station. Due to the closeness to the Copenhagen Airport, some airlines had self-service check-in facilities at this station.

Starting in 2021, the northbound Snälltåget night train from Berlin and Hamburg to Malmö and Stockholm Central Station stops at Svågertorp station for Swedish border police checks, but not for passengers to board or alight.

References

External links
Time tables (in Swedish). Select routes number 103 and 108

Railway stations in Malmö
Buildings and structures in Malmö
21st-century establishments in Skåne County
Øresund Line